The Doolboong, also known as Duulngari, were an Aboriginal Australian people of the Northern Territory and northeast Western Australia.

Language
Doolboong, alternatively named Tuplung/Duulingari, is believed to have belonged to the Jarrakan languages. The language is extinct and little is known of it.

People
Little is known of the Doolboong. Norman Tindale placed them in the mangrove flats and springs on the coast to the north and west of Ninbing Station, stating that they ranged from Wyndham eastwards as far as the mouth of the Keep River across the border into the Northern Territory. The Australian Institute of Aboriginal and Torres Strait Islander Studies interactive map places them inland, within the same colour code, north of the Miriwung people, and south of the Gadjerong. The linguist William B. McGregor states that their language was spoken on the Cambridge Gulf and that they lay west of the Gadjerong.

Clans
Tindale names three hordes known to be subdivisions of the Doolboong.
 Pokai
 Kanjai (located west of Knob Peak)
 Wardaia (located east of Knob Peak)

Alternative names
 Kurramo (language name)
 Pokai Kanjai Wardaia, Wardai, Wardia''

References

Sources

Aboriginal peoples of the Northern Territory
Aboriginal peoples of Western Australia